The Social Registry is a record label based in Brooklyn, New York that was started in 2003. It was voted "Best New Record label" in The Village Voice's Best of New York issue in 2004.

Artists

Artanker Convoy, 
Blood Lines, 
Blood on the Wall,
Christy & Emily,
Douglas Armour,
Electroputas,
Gang Gang Dance,
Growing,
Highlife,
Jah Division,
Mas Ysa,
Mike Bones,
Psychic Ills, 
Samara Lubelski,
Sian Alice Group,
Zs

Discography

References

External links
 
SOMA Magazine » Archive » Purveyors of Escapism
The Social Registry Throws a Social

American record labels
Record labels established in 2003
Indie rock record labels